The Men's Slalom in the 2021 FIS Alpine Skiing World Cup involved 11 events including the final, exactly as scheduled without any cancellations.

Austrian skier Marco Schwarz jumped out to a huge lead in the standings; after winning the slalom in Flachau. Austria, Schwarz had over a 200-point lead on the field. From there, Schwarz just needed to stay healthy to record an easy victory, and he clinched the discipline title for 2021 (and the crystal globe that goes with it) after the tenth event. 

The finals were held on 21 March 2021 in Lenzerheide, Switzerland; only the top 25 in the discipline ranking, the winner of the Junior World Championship, and athletes who have scored at least 500 points in the overall classification were eligible to participate, and only the top 15 scored points.

The season was interrupted by the 2021 World Ski Championships, which were held from 8–21 February in Cortina d'Ampezzo, Italy.  The men's slalom was held on 21 February 2021.

Standings

DNQ = Did Not Qualify for run 2
DNF1 = Did Not Finish run 1
DNF2 = Did Not Finish run 2
DSQ1 = Disqualified run 1
DSQ2 = Disqualified run 2

Updated at 21 March 2021 after all events.

See also
 2021 Alpine Skiing World Cup – Men's summary rankings
 2021 Alpine Skiing World Cup – Men's Overall
 2021 Alpine Skiing World Cup – Men's Downhill
 2021 Alpine Skiing World Cup – Men's Super-G
 2021 Alpine Skiing World Cup – Men's Giant Slalom
 2021 Alpine Skiing World Cup – Men's Parallel
 World Cup scoring system

References

External links
 Alpine Skiing at FIS website

Men's Slalom
FIS Alpine Ski World Cup slalom men's discipline titles